Shahrud District is in Khalkhal County, Ardabil province, Iran. At the 2006 census, its population was 13,701 in 3,604 households. The following census in 2011 counted 12,650 people in 3,693 households. At the latest census in 2016, the district had 11,770 inhabitants living in 3,977 households. The district is located in the Alborz (Elburz) mountain range. Tati is the main language of the district.

See also

References 

Khalkhal County

Districts of Ardabil Province

Populated places in Ardabil Province

Populated places in Khalkhal County

Settled areas of Elburz